The Victoria City Rowing Club is a non-profit rowing club located at Elk Lake in Victoria, British Columbia, Canada.

VCRC offers a variety of recreational and seasonal rowing programs and services including programs for beginners, corporate retreats, customized training camps, and private coaching. There are three classes of membership:  Junior (individuals under 19 yrs), Senior (individuals over 18 yrs), and Masters (27+).  The other seasonal programs include: Youth Learn to Row, Youth Rec Rowing, Youth Summer Camps, Adult Learn to Row, Adult Rec Rowing, Novice Masters, and Community Corporate Rowing Challenge.

The colours of the VCRC uniform are green, white, and black. The uniform features a green top with a white 'V' on the back and the club logo on the front, with black bottoms. The oars have a white blade and a green chevron or 'V' on both sides. The white 'V' on the uniforms and the green 'V' or chevron on the oars are symbolic of the 'V' in Victoria.

The Victoria City Rowing Club is one of four member user groups that comprise the Victoria Rowing Society (VRS) that use the Elk Lake facility.  Other members of VRS are: The Greater Victoria Youth Rowing Society (GVYRS) that comprises eight middle and secondary schools; Rowing Canada Aviron (RCA); and the University of Victoria.

Notable Olympians

1956 Summer Olympics
Lorne Loomer

1960 Summer Olympics
Lorne Loomer
David Anderson

1964 Summer Olympics
Leif Gotfredsen

1984 Summer Olympics
Tim Storm
Harold Backer
Silken Laumann
Lisa Roy
Janice Mason
Andrea Schreiner

1988 Summer Olympics
Pat Newman
Silken Laumann
Harold Backer
John Wallace
Terry Paul
Patrick Walter

1992 Summer Olympics
Brenda Taylor
Silken Laumann
Harold Backer
John Wallace
Terry Paul

1996 Summer Olympics
Adam Parfitt
Phil Graham
Gavin Hassett
Theresa Luke
Pat Newman
Silken Laumann

2000 Summer Olympics
Iain Brambell
Adam Parfitt
Gavin Hassett
Phil Graham
Kristen Wall
Theresa Luke

2004 Summer Olympics
Kevin Light
Iain Brambell
Anna-Marie de Zwager
Gavin Hassett
David Calder

2008 Summer Olympics
Kevin Light
Iain Brambell
Meghan Montgomery
Anna-Marie de Zwager
Malcolm Howard
David Calder

2012 Summer Olympics
Patricia Obee
Lindsay Jennerich
Jeremiah Brown

Honours

Henley Royal Regatta

References

External links
http://www.vcrc.bc.ca

Organizations based in Victoria, British Columbia
Sport in Victoria, British Columbia
Rowing clubs in Canada
Youth sport in Canada